The canton of Jarnac is an administrative division of the Charente department, southwestern France. Its borders were modified at the French canton reorganisation which came into effect in March 2015. Its seat is in Jarnac.

It consists of the following communes:
 
Bassac
Bourg-Charente
Chassors
Fleurac
Foussignac
Houlette
Jarnac
Julienne
Mainxe-Gondeville
Mérignac
Les Métairies
Nercillac
Réparsac
Sainte-Sévère
Saint-Même-les-Carrières
Sigogne
Triac-Lautrait

References

Cantons of Charente